Niklas Wellen (born 14 December 1994) is a German field hockey player who plays as a forward for  Bundesliga club Crefelder HTC and the Germany national team.

Club career
Wellen played for the first team of Crefelder HTC since he was 16 years old. In February 2020 he signed a two-year contract at Pinoké in the Netherlands from the 2020–21 season onwards. During the 2021–22 indoor season he scored the winning goal in the championship final against HDM as Pinoké won its first national title. He was named the best player of the Dutch indoor season. At the end of the outdoor season he returned to Crefelder HTC.

International career
He represented his country at the 2016 Summer Olympics, where he won the bronze medal. On 28 May 2021, he was named in the squads for the 2021 EuroHockey Championship and the 2020 Summer Olympics. He scored four goals in the EuroHockey tournament as they won the silver medal after they lost the final to the Netherlands after a shoot-out.

References

External links
 
 
 

1994 births
Living people
German male field hockey players
Sportspeople from Krefeld
Male field hockey forwards
Field hockey players at the 2016 Summer Olympics
Field hockey players at the 2020 Summer Olympics
2018 Men's Hockey World Cup players
Olympic field hockey players of Germany
Olympic bronze medalists for Germany
Olympic medalists in field hockey
Medalists at the 2016 Summer Olympics
Men's Hoofdklasse Hockey players
Men's Feldhockey Bundesliga players
2023 Men's FIH Hockey World Cup players
21st-century German people